The 2022 Davidson Wildcats football team represented Davidson College  as a member of the Pioneer Football League (PFL) during the 2022 NCAA Division I FCS football season. They were led by fifth-year head coach Scott Abell and played their home games at Richardson Stadium. Although the Wildcats finished in a second place tie in the conference with a 6-2 conference record, they claimed the PFL’s automatic bid in the FCS Playoffs (due to St. Thomas (MN) being ineligible due to their 5-year transition from Division III to Division I) after narrowly defeating Dayton 24-23 in the final week of the regular season.

Previous season

The Wildcats finished the 2021 season with a record of 8–3, 7–1 in PFL play to be co-champions of Pioneer League championship San Diego. Due to head to head tie breaker with San Diego, they received an automatic bid to the FCS Playoffs where they lost in the first round to Kennesaw State.

Schedule

Game summaries

at Jacksonville State

Barton

St. Andrews

at Presbyterian

Butler

at St. Thomas (MN)

Morehead State

at Drake

Stetson

at San Diego

Dayton

at Richmond

References

Davidson
Davidson Wildcats football seasons
Davidson Wildcats football
Davidson